Deron Timothy Quint (born March 12, 1976) is an American former professional ice hockey defenseman. His playing experience included spending time in the National Hockey League with the Winnipeg Jets, Phoenix Coyotes, New Jersey Devils, Columbus Blue Jackets, Chicago Blackhawks and New York Islanders.

Playing career
As a youth, Quint played in the 1989 and 1990 Quebec International Pee-Wee Hockey Tournaments with a minor ice hockey team from Rye, New York.

Quint was drafted 30th overall by Winnipeg in the 1994 NHL Entry Draft  As a rookie in the 1995–96 season, by scoring two goals in a four-second span, he tied an NHL record originally set by Nels Stewart of the Montreal Maroons in 1931.  The next season the Jets became the Phoenix Coyotes and Quint remained with Phoenix until he was traded to the New Jersey Devils on March 7, 2000, for Lyle Odelein. Quint would only play four regular-season games for the Devils before being traded to the expansion Columbus Blue Jackets on June 23 the same year where he stayed for two seasons leading the Blue Jackets in minutes played per game. For the 2002–03 season, Quint rejoined the Coyotes for a second campaign, and he later joined the Chicago Blackhawks the next season.

During the NHL lockout, which resulted in the 2004–05 season being cancelled, Quint played for Bolzano HC in Italy. He later played for Kloten in Switzerland.

In 2005, Quint joined Eisbären Berlin of Germany's Deutsche Eishockey Liga and led them to 3 league championships in 4 seasons. At the end of the 2006–07 DEL season, he signed with the New York Islanders and returned to the NHL, playing five games and assisting them in making the playoffs. He returned to the Eisbaren for the 2007–08 DEL season while becoming the DEL Defenseman of the Year and leading the Bears to another league championship. Quint led all scoring for defenseman during the 08-09 season, while setting a franchise record of playing in 237 consecutive games and winning a 3rd DEL Championship. Quint was a DEL All-Star defenseman for three seasons.

After four years in Berlin, Quint left Germany and signed with HC Neftekhimik Nizhnekamsk of the predominantly Russian Kontinental Hockey League. In 2010, he signed with Traktor Chelyabinsk. He set a record for most goals scored by a KHL defenseman in 2010–11 and was selected to the KHL West All-Star team in the 2012–13 season.

On May 1, 2013, Quint signed a two-year contract with HC Spartak Moscow. On January 15, 2014, due to Spartak's financial woes, he was traded to CSKA Moscow together with Jeff Glass for monetary compensation. On May 6, 2014, Quint opted to return to his past successes in the KHL, by signing with Traktor Chelyabinsk.

Quint would play for Traktor Chelyabinsk in 416 games (the most by any North American), and scored 189 (75 goals + 114 assists) points. He was a two-time participant in the KHL All-Star Game in 2013 and 2014, the top scorer among defenders in the league in 2011 and 2014, and winner of the League in 2012, a silver and bronze medalist in the KHL in 2012 and 2013.

During the 2015–16 season, Quint was made captain of Traktor. He made history on February 16, 2016, in the away match against Metallurg Magnitogorsk, where he earned an assist. He became the oldest hockey player in the history of Traktor Chelyabinsk to play in an official match, at 39 years old. In 52 games, Quint scored 11 points.

After leaving the KHL in the offseason, Quint opted to continue his veteran career back in Germany, signing a one-year deal with reigning champions EHC München on June 9, 2016. He helped lead the team to a championship.

Career statistics

Regular season and playoffs

International

Awards and achievements
1994–95  WHL  West First All-Star Team
2006, 2007, 2008 DEL All-Star Team
2008 DEL Defenseman of the Year
   2012–13  Traktor Chelyabinsk.
    2011–12 Traktor Chelyabinsk.
2013 KHL West All-Star Team
2014 KHL East All-Star Team

References

External links
 

1976 births
American men's ice hockey defensemen
Bolzano HC players
Chicago Blackhawks players
Columbus Blue Jackets players
EHC Kloten players
EHC München players
Eisbären Berlin players
American expatriate ice hockey players in Russia
HC CSKA Moscow players
HC Neftekhimik Nizhnekamsk players
HC Spartak Moscow players
Ice hockey people from New Hampshire
Living people
New Jersey Devils players
New York Islanders players
People from Durham, New Hampshire
Phoenix Coyotes players
Seattle Thunderbirds players
Sportspeople from Strafford County, New Hampshire
Springfield Falcons players
Syracuse Crunch players
Traktor Chelyabinsk players
Winnipeg Jets (1979–1996) draft picks
Winnipeg Jets (1979–1996) players